Montane oriole may refer to:

 Green-headed oriole, a species of bird found in eastern Africa
 Mountain oriole, a species of bird found in central and eastern Africa

Birds by common name